Leo Patrick Murray (August 24, 1899 – November 20, 1965) was a Canadian professional ice hockey forward who played 6 games in the National Hockey League for the Montreal Canadiens. He was born in Montreal, Quebec. He is buried in Cote de Neiges Cemetery in Montreal, Quebec.

References

External links
 

1899 births
1965 deaths
Anglophone Quebec people
Canadian ice hockey forwards
Ice hockey people from Montreal
Montreal Canadiens players
Providence Reds players
[[Category:Quebec Castors players]
Springfield Indians players